Dmitry Vadimovich Kharatyan (born 21 January 1960) is a Soviet and Russian actor of Armenian descent, People's Artist of Russia.

Was born in Olmaliq, Uzbek SSR on 21 January 1960. His debut as an actor came in Vladimir Menshov's Practical Joke in 1977.

In March 2014, he signed a letter in support of the position of the Russian president, Vladimir Putin, on the Russian annexation of Crimea. In April and May 2022, Kharatyan participated in a series of concerts organized in order to support the 2022 Russian invasion of Ukraine. In January 2023, Ukraine imposed sanctions on Dmitry for his support of 2022 Russian invasion of Ukraine.

Selected filmography
 Practical Joke (1977) as Igor Grushko
 Fox Hunting (1980) as Kostya Stryzhak
 Summer Impressions of Planet Z (1986) as Andrei Morkovkin
 Gardemarines ahead! (1988) as Aleksei Korsak
 Private Detective, or Operation Cooperation (1989) as Dmitry Puzyrev
 Viva gardemarines! (1991) as Aleksei Korsak
 Weather Is Good on Deribasovskaya, It Rains Again on Brighton Beach (1992) as Fyodor Sokolov / One-Eyed Sheik
 Gardemarines-III (1992) as Aleksei Korsak
 Black Square (1992)
 The Secret of Queen Anne or Musketeers Thirty Years After (1993) as Louis XIV of France / Philip Marchiali
 Moscow Saga (2004) as Shevchuk
 Cars (2006; Russian voice) as Lightning McQueen
 The Return of the Musketeers, or The Treasures of Cardinal Mazarin (2009) as Louis XIV of France
 The Cube (Russian version; 2013) as Host

Notes

References

External links
 
 

1960 births
Living people
Russian game show hosts
Russian male actors
Soviet Armenians
Russian people of Armenian descent
Uzbekistani people of Armenian descent
People from Olmaliq
Ethnic Armenian male actors
People's Artists of Russia
Honored Artists of the Russian Federation
Russian male voice actors
Russian television presenters
Soviet male child actors
Moscow State University of Economics, Statistics, and Informatics alumni